SIU may refer to:

 Seafarers International Union of North America, an organization of labor unions
 Segment of Independent Utility, a highway engineering term for divisions of large-scale construction projects; see 
 Shinawatra University, in Bangkok, Thailand
 S.I.U. (film), a 2011 South Korean action film
 Siuna Airport in Nicaragua (IATA Code) 
 Slave In Utero, the pen-name of Lee Jong-hui, author of the South Korean webcomic Tower of God
 Southern Illinois University, US
 Special Investigations Unit (Ontario), a police oversight agency in Ontario, Canada
 Special Investigating Unit, South African law enforcement agency
 Symbiosis International University, in India

Siu may refer to:

 Shao, a Chinese surname, sometimes transliterated as Siu
 Siu, a god-hero of Torres Strait Islander people
 Xiao (surname), a Chinese surname, sometimes transliterated as Siu

See also
 Special Investigations Unit (disambiguation)